Solopaca is a comune (municipality) in the Province of Benevento in the Italian region Campania, located about  northeast of Naples and about  northwest of Benevento.

Solopaca borders the following municipalities: Castelvenere, Frasso Telesino, Guardia Sanframondi, Melizzano, Telese Terme, Vitulano.

Demographic evolution

Solopaca DOC
Italian wine, both red and white, under the Solopaca DOC appellation comes from this area in the hillside vineyards along the Calore river. Grapes destined for DOC production must be harvested to a maximum yield of 13 tonnes/hectare for red grape varieties and 15 tonnes/ha for white grape varieties. The finished wines need to be fermented to a minimum alcohol level of 11.5% for reds and 12% for whites.

Red Solopaca wine is a blend of 45-60% Sangiovese, 10-20% Aglianico, 20-25% Piedirosso and/or Sciascinoso and up to 10% of other local red grape varieties permitted to fill in the remainder of the blend. The white wines are produced from 50 to 70% Trebbiano, 20-40% Malvasia di Candia, Malvasia Toscana and/or Coda di Volpe with other local white grape varieties permitted up to 10%.

References

Cities and towns in Campania